"Bad Girl" is a single by American singer La Toya Jackson. It was the lead single and title track of her 1989 album Bad Girl.

Release history

In 1989 Jackson started working on her sixth album, which was by then tentatively titled On My Own, with German producer Anthony Monn. The album was to be released by German label TELDEC and distributed through RCA records, like her previous studio album La Toya. Bad Girl was chosen as the lead single and it was released through TELDEC in mid-1989 in Germany, where it failed to chart. The single featured the b-side Piano Man. The song's title is a play on her brother's successful 1987 song Bad.

TELDEC and RCA records decided not to release the 9-track On My Own album, reportedly because of issues with Jackson's then-manager Jack Gordon, and the album was shelved. It was not until 1990 that Gordon sold the album to Sherman Records, who first released it in Italy as 12" vinyl album and later licensed it to countless small labels to release it. The album was retitled Bad Girl, and included three new tracks: the b-side Piano Man, Sexual Feeling and You and Me, the latter two of which Jackson had recorded in 1990. The original issue of the Bad Girl album featured the same artwork as the Bad Girl single.

Live performances and music video

Teldec Records initiated a huge promotional campaign in June 1989 with Jackson presenting the song in four TV shows, including Günther Jauch's Na Siehste! (where she had previously performed her last single You Blew), followed by a performance on ZDF Fernsehgarten and the NDR Talk-Show (both shows being broadcast on the same day).

The music video for the track shows Jackson with two male dancers who also performed with her on the TV shows, one of them being what would later become the lead singer for the Captain Hollywood Project. The background is a bluescreen that shows Jackson and the dancers dancing on a street. Jackson also appears on the video driving a pink convertible Cadillac.

Formats and track listings 

7" Single
Bad Girl 4:02
Piano Man 4:12

12" Single
Bad Girl (12" Version) 7:00
Bad Girl 4:02
Piano Man 4:12

CD single
Bad Girl 4:02
Piano Man 4:12
Bad Girl (N.Y.-Munich House Mix) 5:20

1989 singles
La Toya Jackson songs
1989 songs
Songs written by Felix Weber (songwriter)